The 8th Kanonloppet was a motor race, run for Formula One cars, held on 12 August 1962 at the Karlskoga circuit, Sweden. The race was run over 30 laps of the little circuit, and was won by American driver Masten Gregory in a Lotus 24, run by the UDT Laystall Racing Team.

Race
In training, Graham Hill left the track and damaged the nose on the Rob Walker Lotus 24. He went on to compete without a nosecone. Rookie Olle Nygren could not find fourth gear in the Lotus 18 he had borrowed from Jay Chamberlain, and was also having a hard time finding his brake points. Nygren qualified last and only lasted six laps of this, his only Formula One race. Kurt Kuhnke's interesting Borgward-engined Lotus only made a few practice laps before it spun a main bearing and was withdrawn. A recent resurfacing of the track led to lap times dropping by about 5 seconds compared to 1961, meaning some last-minute modifications to the cars had to be carried out to account for the higher speeds.

Surtees took the lead from pole, but already on the second lap Masten Gragory passed him in Tröskurvan (curve one). Surtees tried to take back the lead, but missed a gearshift after being blinded by water splashed by Gregory's car. Gregory took a lead of about five car lengths and was never threatened again. Innes Ireland had gone off the track on the opening lap but clawed his way back up the field for a fourth place in the end, putting down a new lap record along the way. On the 11th lap Surtees retired with a broken valve spring, Hill with an oil leak, and ninth-placed Collomb with engine failure. Bonnier seemed to be in a secure second place, but Salvadori in the Lola gave chase and managed to pass. Bonnier made a spirited attempt to regain second in the last turn of the race, but came up three metres short at the flag. Burgess and Count de Beaufort finished a lap down, both in four-cylinder cars while the first four all raced eight-cylinder ones. Burgess' Cooper was a unique mix of Formula Junior and Formula One parts, all in the interest of minimizing frontal area. De Beaufort's car, while entered by his private team Ecurie Maarsbergen, was supported by the factory and he shared three mechanics with Bonnier.

Results

References

 "The Grand Prix Who's Who", Steve Small, 1995.

Kanonloppet
Kanonloppet